The Aerobee rocket was one of the United States' most produced and productive sounding rockets. Developed by the Aerojet Corporation, the Aerobee was designed to combine the altitude and launching capability of the V-2 with the cost effectiveness and mass production of the WAC Corporal. More than 1000 Aerobees were launched between 1947 and 1985, returning vast amounts of astronomical, physical, aeronomical, and biomedical data.

Development
Research using V-2 rockets after World War II produced valuable results concerning the nature of cosmic rays, the solar spectrum, and the distribution of atmospheric ozone. However, the limited supply and the expense of assembling and firing the V-2 rockets, as well as the small payload capacity of the first purpose-built sounding rocket, the WAC Corporal, created demand for a low cost sounding rocket to be used for scientific research. Aerojet was to be the prime contractor while Douglas Aircraft, also a producer of WAC Corporals, would provide aerodynamic engineering and take on some of the production.

The Aerojet designation for new rocket was "Aerobee", a contraction of Aerojet, manufacturer of the engine, and Bumblebee, a Navy guided missile program. It was a single-stage, liquid-fueled, fin-stabilized rocket, using a solid-propellant rocket motor as a booster. This booster was jettisoned after 2.5 seconds of operation.  The nose cone containing the telemetry transmitter and the scientific payload was recoverable and returned to earth on a parachute. As with its progenitor, the WAC Corporal, the Aerobee required a tall launch tower to provide the necessary stability until the relatively slowly accelerating rocket gained enough speed for its fins to be effective in controlling attitude. Launch towers were adjustable in inclination and azimuth to compensate for wind.

On 25 September 1947, a dummy Aerobee attached to a live engine was launched from White Sands Missile Range, New Mexico for flight testing. This was followed (after two more dummy tests in October) by the first complete Aerobee launch on 24 November. The flight was terminated after 35 seconds when the rocket's tail began yawing back and forth. This Aerobee was the first rocket fired by the US Navy at White Sands and the subject of the first comprehensive missile range safety program.

Operational history

Early launches
The original Aerobee design was designated RTV-N-8 by the Navy and XASR-1 by Aerojet and the Army. This rocket was powered by the XASR-1, a  version of the 21AL-2600 engine also used in the Nike Ajax.

The XASR-1 engine was superseded by the XASR-2, which used helium for fuel tank pressurization instead of compressed air. First flying in late 1949, Aerobees using the new engine were designated RTV-N-10(a) by the Navy and RTV-A-1 by the Air Force.

The Navy also evolved their XASR-2 Aerobees. The RTV-N-10b used a variant of the −10a's engine with a higher specific impulse; the RTV-N-10c was a production variant of the −10b. The USAF fielded a production version of the RTV-N-10b, which did not get an official designation.

This inauspicious beginning was followed by 32 more Aerobee flights, most of which were successful, including the first successful flight of a monkey, on 18 April 1951.

By the early 1950s Aerobee was the sounding rocket of choice being flown by the Navy Research Laboratory, USAF, and Army Signal Corps. The cost of lofting a pound of scientific payload to altitude was significantly lower than that of any competitor. In 1955, the USAF's RTV-A-1 rockets were redesignated X-8 (X-8a-d corresponding with the old RTV-A-1a-d series).

Later versions
The first major derivative version, the Aerobee-Hi (first launched in 1955) featured an increase in length, fuel capacity and improved engineering design. There were two versions of the Aerobee-Hi. The Air Force Aerobee Hi, (MX-1960, XRM-84) and the slightly longer Navy Aerobee-Hi (RV-N-13, PWN-2A). Engine development continued with the AJ11-6, AJ11-18, AJ11-20, AJ11-21, and AGVL0113C/F/H/I of the Aerobee-Hi. The Aerobe-Hi was boosted by the 2.5 KS-18000 booster. The Navy Aerobee-Hi was considerably different from the Air Force Aerobee-Hi, using the fuel pressure regulator from the Nike Ajax, a delayed start function and a pressure sealed tail cone to allow better measurement of the external upper atmosphere.

Following the creation of NASA, development of Aerobees became largely guided by NASA. Exceptions developed for the armed services included the Aerobee 170, aka Nike-Aerobee, which combined the Nike M5E1 booster with the Aerobee 150, and the Aerobee 300 which used a AIM-7 Sparrow missile motor in its second stage; the Aerobee 300 was also known as the Sparrowbee. There were versions of Aerobee-Hi such as the Aerobee 150 and 150A in which case the difference was in the number of fins, the 150 having three and the 150A four. The Aerobee 100 was essentially a shortened Aerobee 150 with an AJ11 engine. By far the largest of the Aerobee series was the Aerobee 350, composed of four clustered Aerobee 150s boosted by a Nike M5E1. Though they bore the Aerobee appellation, the Aerobee 75 and proposed Aerobee 90 were not actually related to the others in that they were solid propellant rockets with the 75 having a HAWK motor, the 90 was a 75 with a Sparrow second stage.

Over the decades of development Aerobees were flown with many related engines including the XASR-1 (21AL-2600), 45AL-2600, AJ10-24, AJ10-25, AJ10-27, AJ10-34, AJ11-6, and AJ60-92. Later versions of the AJ10 and AJ-11 engines produced  of thrust. Boosters included surplus Nike M5E1 boosters and VKM-17 and VKM-20s as we'll as the original 2.5KS-18000.

Launch towers for Aerobee rockets were built at the White Sands Missile Range and Holloman AFB in New Mexico; Wallops Flight Facility in Virginia; Eglin AFB in Florida; Churchill Rocket Research Range in Manitoba, Canada; and Woomera, South Australia. Aerobees were also launched from Centro de Lancamento da Barreira do Inferno (CLBI), Natal, Rio Grande N, Brazil; Kauai Test Facility, Barking Sands, Kauai; Nouadhibou, Dakhlet Nouadhibou, Mauritania; Vandenberg AFB, California; Walker's Cay, Bahamas; and aboard the research vessel USS Norton Sound. Two Seabee missiles were launched from the sea off Point Mugu, California. The Seabee's (Sea launched Aerobees) were launched from a position floating in water as part of Robert Truax's Sea Dragon project for Aerojet. The Aerobees launched from overseas locations such as the Bahamas used a modified launch tower that had originally been used on the USS Norton Sound. NASA further modified that tower into the Mobile Aerobee Launch Facility (MALF) which was first used in 1966 for launches from Natal, Brazil.

A total of 1,037 Aerobees (including variants) were launched from all locations with a success rate in excess of 97%. More than half of these were Aerobee 150/150As. The last Aerobee, a 150 MI, flew an Airglow payload at White Sands on 17 January 1985.

Australian launches
The Agreement between the Government of Australia and the Government of the United States of America regarding the Launching of Three Aerobee Rockets was established in Canberra, March 1970. A similar treaty was agreed to in 1973 for seven launches, and in 1977 for six launches for various astronomical and solar experiments conducted by NASA Goddard Space Flight Center.

In 1974, the US DARPA through Air Force Cambridge Research Laboratory and Australia agreed to launch three rockets under project Hi Star South.

A total of 20 Aerobee launches were made at Woomera Test Range:
 Series 150: 3 launches in May/June 1970
 Series 170: 7 launches in November 1973 and 2 launches February 1977
 Series 200: 3 launches in September 1974
 Series 200A: 5 launches in February 1977

Accomplishments

Science

The scientific research done with the Aerobee family included photography, biomedical research, biology, the study of energetic particles, ionospheric physics, meteorology, radio astronomy, solar physics, aeronomy, spectrometry, signals intelligence research, infrared studies, magnetometry, ultraviolet and X-ray astronomy, as well as many other fields such as aerodynamic research and missile technology development. Aerobees were a vital part of America's efforts in the International Geophysical Year, comprising more than half of the allocated IGY sounding rocket budget.

The earliest space biomedical missions were launched via Aerobee: Three Air Force missions carrying mice and monkeys, launched 1951–52, determined that the brief (~15 minutes) exposure to acceleration, reduced gravity, and high altitude cosmic radiation did not have significant negative effects.

An Aerobee 150 launched on 19 June 1962 (UTC) detected the first X-rays emitted from a source outside our solar system (Scorpius X-1).

First payload to interplanetary space

On 16 October 1957, Aerobee USAF-88 was launched from Holloman LC-A in New Mexico to hurl the first artificial objects into interplanetary space. Post-launch analysis suggested that at least two fragments from the exploding charges had soared away from the Earth with twice the kinetic energy necessary to reach escape velocity and become the first artificial satellites of the sun. When the achievement was announced the following month, it was compared favorably in the contemporary press to the Soviet launch of the first artificial satellite, Sputnik 1, just 12 days before the Aerobee launch. However, subsequent analysis by space historian Jonathan McDowell suggests that none of the payload fragments actually achieved escape velocity.

Legacy
An artifact of the Aerobee programs, which remains in use today, is the large enclosed launch tower built for the Aerobee 350 at White Sands Launch Complex 36.

Technical data

(an additional 36 Aerobees of unknown type were launched by the Army, Navy and Air Force 1957–59)

References

External links 
 

1951 in spaceflight
1953 in spaceflight
1954 in spaceflight
1974 in spaceflight
Sounding rockets of the United States
Spaceflight before 1951